Nagasubramanian Chokkanathan (born January 17, 1977) better known by his pen name N.Chokkan is a Tamil Writer who has written two novels and nearly 100 short stories. His works has been translated into other Indian languages. Apart from this, he has written columns in several Tamil magazines.

Early life
Nagasubramanian Chokkanathan graduated with a bachelor's degree in production engineering from Government College of Technology, Coimbatore  in 1998. He then worked with BaaN Info Systems for two years, then with BroadVision as principal consultant for three years and as director for in InFact Infortech for four years. He is currently serving as senior software development engineer in a technology firm. He also holds a master's diploma in Business Administration from Symbiosis University, Pune.

Writing career
His interest for writing came from his blind aunt for whom he used to read a lot of books. His love for books then made him to write few detective stories, which are not yet published. His first short story was published in 1997.

His entry into non-fiction was started by a publishing house approaching him to write a biography of Sachin Tendulkar. He then wrote biographies of businessmen, politicians and people who shaped the world. The list includes Narayana Murthy, Azim Premji, Dhirubhai Ambani, Walt Disney, and Charlie Chaplin.

Bibliography

Short Stories
 Pachchai Parker Pena
 En Nilaikannadiyil Un Mugam
 Mittai Kathaigal,translation of Kahlil Gibran short stories.

Biographies
 A.R.Rahman: Jai Ho
 Ambani oru vetrikathai
 Mukesh Ambani (Biography)
 Anil Ambani (Biography)
 Bill Gates: Software Sultan
 Infosys Narayanamurthi: Paththaayiram roobai Paththaayiram Kodi aana Kathai
 Azim Premji: ComputerJi
 Lakshmi Mittal: Irumbukai Maayavi
 Ratan Tata (Biography)
 Ambanigal Pirintha Kathai
 Airtel (Sunil Bharti) Mittal: Pesu
 Subash Chandra: Zerovilirunthu Zee Tv varai
 Richard Branson:'Don't care' Master
 Sachin: Oru Puyalin Purvak Kathai
 Dravid:Indhiya Perunchuvar
 Shakespears:Naadagamalla Vaazhkai
 Napoleon:Porkala Puyal
 Salman Rushdie:Fatwa muthal Padma varai
 Kushwant Singh:Vaazhvellam Punnagai
 Anna(nthu paar)
 Veerappan:Vaazhvum Vathamum
 Vaathu Eli Walt Disney
 Charlie Chaplin Kathaigal
 Number 1: Saathanaiyaalargalum saagasakaaragalum

References

External links
 Nagasubramanian Chokkanathan's Official Website
 Na.Chokkan Books in Amazon
 Na.Chokkan Books in GoodReads

20th-century Indian biographers
Living people
Indian male novelists
Indian male short story writers
20th-century Indian short story writers
20th-century Indian male writers
1977 births
Male biographers